Katya Ismailova is a 1994 Russian drama film directed by Valery Todorovsky.

Plot 
The film tells about a woman who for the first time in her life felt passion and as a result became uncontrollable.

Cast 
 Vladimir Mashkov as Sergey / Katya's lover
 Ingeborga Dapkunaite as Katya / Wife
 Aleksandr Feklistov as Mitya / Husband
 Alisa Freindlich as Irina / mother
 Natalya Shchukina as Sonya / Sergey's ex-lover
 Yury Kuznetsov as Romanov / investigator
 Avangard Leontev as Editor
 Marina Opyonkina
 E. Vakhovshaia
 S. Razguliaeva

References

External links 
 

1994 films
1990s Russian-language films
Russian drama films
1994 drama films
French drama films
Films directed by Valery Todorovsky
1990s French films